Pulkovo Aviation Enterprise Flight 9045 was a cargo flight that crashed on approach to Nalchik while carrying  of coins from the Saint Petersburg Mint.

Aircraft 
The aircraft involved in the accident was an Antonov An-12BP with four Ivchenko AI-20M engines, registered RA-11118 to Pulkovo Aviation Enterprise.

Crew 
Seven crew members and six passengers were aboard the flight. The cockpit crew consisted of:
 Captain Nikolai Petrovich Yanitsky (Russian: Николай Петрович Яницкий)
 Copilot Viktor Anatolievich Prasolov (Виктор Анатольевич Прасолов)
 Navigator Mikhail Nikolayevich Vlasov (Михаил Николаевич Власов)
 Radio operator Aleksandr Yurevich Levchuk (Александр Юрьевич Левчук)
 Flight engineer Sergey Maratovich Anisimov (Сергей Маратович Анисимов)
 Flight operations manager Yuri Anatolyevich Yevstafiev (Юрий Анатольевич Евстафьев)

Synopsis 
Flight 9045 carried  of coins in cargo from St. Petersburg to the stopover in Volgograd. Until landing there were no issues during the flight to Nalchik. The air traffic controller informed the flight crew of the weather conditions at the airport, but failed to mention the issue of ice; hence the crew did not activate the de-icing system for the approach.

At an altitude of  the aircraft pitched nose-down 50-55° into a rapid descent; the pilots pulled back on the control columns; but due being at a low altitude the aircraft was unable to recover from the dive, the aircraft crashed into a field and was quickly engulfed in flames.

Cause 
The investigation concluded that causes of the accident were as follows:
 Failure of the airport to update the weather report and notify pilots;
 untimely notification of the dangerous weather forecast;
 incorrect recommendations for executing an approach laid out in the aircraft flight manual;
 failure to use the aircraft de-icing system;
 failure to follow procedures as outlined in the aircraft flight manual.

References 

Aviation accidents and incidents in 1994
Airliner accidents and incidents caused by pilot error
Aviation accidents and incidents in Russia
Accidents and incidents involving the Antonov An-12
1994 disasters in Russia
February 1994 events in Russia